In the U.S. state of Texas, U.S. Highway 87 (US 87) is a north–south U.S. Highway that begins near the Gulf Coast in Port Lavaca, Texas and heads north through San Antonio, Lubbock, Amarillo, and Dalhart to the New Mexico border near Texline.

Route description

US 87 begins at an intersection with State Highway 238 in Port Lavaca. It takes a northwesterly route out of the town, and travels to Victoria, where it intersects US 59 and US 77. Its northwesterly path continues to Cuero, where it merges with (and is briefly co-signed with) US 77 Alternate and US 183 before turning back toward the north. US 87 follows a gentle northwesterly route until just before Smiley, where it takes a more westerly turn. At Nixon, US 87 merges with State Highway 97 and continues west as a co-signed route until just west of Stockdale, where SH 97 leaves the route and US 87 continues to the northwest to San Antonio.

From here, US 87 travels in an almost due northerly heading to Fredericksburg before making a slight turn back to the northwest to Mason, where it merges with US 377.

From Mason, US 87/377 continues north-northwest to Brady, where US 377 leaves the route and US 87 makes a hard turn to the west before taking yet another slight turn to the north and continuing on to San Angelo and the northwest. After intersecting with I-20 at Big Spring, US 87 continues the same northwesterly path to Lamesa, where it takes a turn back to the northeast. After making another turn back to the north just outside O'Donnell, US 87 reaches Lubbock, where it merges with I-27 on the south side of the city.

US 87 is concurrent with I-27 for a majority of its trek to Amarillo, deviating from the interstate route to spur into cities such as Kress, Tulia, and Canyon. The I-27 designation ends at I-40 in Amarillo; here, US 87 splits into the one-way pair of Fillmore Street (northbound) and Taylor Street (southbound, which also carries eastbound US 60). North of Amarillo Boulevard, US 87 and US 287 merge and head due north along a freeway alignment. The two routes separate in Dumas, with US 87 taking a sharp turn to the west before merging with US 385 in Hartley and turning to the northwest. US 385 leaves the route in Dalhart, and US 87 continues on a slight northwesterly path, crossing into New Mexico approximately a mile west of Texline.

Major intersections

See also 
Loops of U.S. Route 87 in Texas
Interstate 27

References

External links 

87
 Texas
Transportation in Calhoun County, Texas
Transportation in Victoria County, Texas
Transportation in DeWitt County, Texas
Transportation in Gonzales County, Texas
Transportation in Wilson County, Texas
Transportation in Bexar County, Texas
Transportation in Kendall County, Texas
Transportation in Kerr County, Texas
Transportation in Gillespie County, Texas
Transportation in Mason County, Texas
Transportation in McCulloch County, Texas
Transportation in Concho County, Texas
Transportation in Tom Green County, Texas
Transportation in Coke County, Texas
Transportation in Sterling County, Texas
Transportation in Glasscock County, Texas
Transportation in Howard County, Texas
Transportation in Martin County, Texas
Transportation in Dawson County, Texas
Transportation in Lynn County, Texas
Transportation in Lubbock County, Texas
Transportation in Hale County, Texas
Transportation in Swisher County, Texas
Transportation in Randall County, Texas
Transportation in Potter County, Texas
Transportation in Moore County, Texas
Transportation in Hartley County, Texas
Transportation in Dallam County, Texas
Transportation in Lubbock, Texas